The Joint Financial Management Improvement Program (JFMIP) is a joint and cooperative action undertaken by the U.S. Department of the Treasury, Government Accountability Office (GAO), the Office of Management and Budget (OMB), and the Office of Personnel Management (OPM). The goal of the JFMIP is to improve financial management practices in the federal government.

See also
Offices
Comptroller and Auditor General
Comptroller
Inspector General
Treasurer
Government Accountability Project
Project On Government Oversight

References

External links 

GAO homepage

Government agencies established in 1950
1950 establishments in the United States